Jeongjo of Joseon (28 October 1752 – 18 August 1800), personal name Yi San (Korean: 이산; Hanja: 李祘), sometimes called Jeongjo the Great (Korean: 정조대왕; Hanja: 正祖大王), was the 22nd monarch of the Joseon dynasty of Korea. After succeeding his grandfather, King Yeongjo, he made various attempts to reform and improve the nation.

Biography

Early life
He was the son of Crown Prince Sado (who was put to death by his own father, King Yeongjo) and Lady Hyegyeong (who wrote an autobiography, The Memoirs of Lady Hyegyeong detailing her life as the ill-fated Crown Princess of Korea). His elder brother Crown Prince Uiso died in infancy. His mother Lady Hyegyeong's collection of memoirs serves as a significant source of historical information on the political happenings during the reigns of King Yeongjo (her father-in-law), King Jeongjo (her son), and King Sunjo (her grandson).

In 1762, his father, Crown Prince Sado, was executed by King Yeongjo (Crown Prince Sado's father and Prince Yi San's grandfather) after long conflicts and Sado's years of mental illness. Crown Prince Sado opposed the ruling party Noron party. He started to hate the parties of Joseon. Eight years later Yi San asked to visit Sado's living quarter but his Grandfather King Yeongjo refused. So he refused to attend Crown Prince Sado's funeral. On February 21, 1764, Yi San became the adoptive son of Crown Prince Hyojang and Princess Consort Hyosun by the order of King Yeongjo. Crown Prince Hyojang was the elder half-brother of his father, Crown Prince Sado. Crown Prince Hyojang though, had died during his childhood. King Yeongjo made Yi San a part of Hyojang's family because he was concerned that Yi San, who was Sado's son and successor, would be opposed. The Noron faction protested Yi San's legitimacy as the royal successor under the claim that Yi San was the 'Son of a prisoner' or 'Son of a madman' and thus ineligible to succeed the throne. This was a major source of vexation for King Yeongjo for an extended period.

After 1762 to 1777, some members of Noron attempted to depose Jeongjo for his relation to Crown Prince Sado and open the path of succession for his half-brothers Prince Eunjeon, Prince Euneon and, Prince Eunshin. His grand uncle Hong In-han and Jeong Hu-gyeom, adopted son of Princess Hwawan, were amongst them. When he was the Crown Prince, King Jeongjo met Hong Guk-yeong (홍국영, 洪國榮), a controversial politician who first strongly supported Jeongjo's accession and toiled to improve the king's power, but ended up being expelled because of his desire for power. Another helper was Kim Jong-su(김종수, 金鍾秀), in spite of being a member of Noron.

In 1775, one year before King Yeongjo's death, King Jeongjo was appointed regent for him. However, King Yeongjo did not give him any military power.

Reign
Before Yeongjo died, he had his coronation in Gyeonghuigung on 10 March 1776. After his coronation, Jeongjo chose his spouse. The first thing that Jeongjo said to his officials was that he is the son of Jangjo who was executed by the former king. Jeongjo tried to empathize with his people. During his second year of reign, a great drought came. During the drought, Jeongjo was nervous just like the people and did a rainmaking ritual for his people. Just like his grandfather, Jeongjo used Tangpyeong method. He included that this method was great. By this, he tried to get rid of all the parties which caused his father's death.

From the first day of the reign, Jeongjo spent much of his reign trying to clear his father's name. He also moved the court to the city of Suwon to be closer to his father's grave. He built Hwaseong Fortress to guard the tomb. It is now a UNESCO World Heritage Site.

Jeongjo was always threatened by some of his officials who were against his reign. By help of Hong Guk-yeong and some others, he was able to overcome.

During his accession, he also issued a royal decree that his mother, Lady Hyegyeong, be a Dowager Queen since his father, her husband, was supposed to be the King before him. Thus, she became the Queen Dowager, the widow of Crown Prince Sado. From then on, King Jeongjo experienced many turbulent periods, but overcame them with the aid of Hong Guk-yeong, Kim Chong-su.

In 1776, Hong Sang-beom, Hong Kye-neung and other some member of Noron unsuccessfully attempted to stage a military coup d'état and assassinate him. Jeongjo fought the rebels who were secretly in royal palace  and personally arrested his assassins. Jeongjo executed Hong Sang-beom, Hong Kye-neung, other some member of Norons, and put to death Prince Eunjeon, Hong In-han, and Chung Hu-kyom.

Jeongjo tried to stop the wrong politics that concentrated the political power to single family by impeaching Hong Guk-yeong but it failed.

In 1785 he erected Changyongyeong (장용영, 壯勇營), this is the King's royal bodyguards. Before In 1782, Jeongjo selected by competitive examination some officers, who were then organized into the unit of Changyongyeong. Before this time was the Naekeunwe, royal bodyguards of Joseon dynasties created by Taejong of Joseon in 1407. But Jeongjo mistrusted the Naekeumwi, so he personally created Changyonegyeong.

Renaissance
King Jeongjo led the new renaissance of the Joseon Dynasty, but was initially stopped by continuing the policy of Yeongjo's Tangpyeong rule. He tried to control the politics of the whole nation to advance and further national progress.

He made various reforms throughout his reign, notably establishing Kyujanggak (규장각), a royal library. The primary purpose of Kyujanggak was to improve the cultural and political stance of Joseon and to recruit gifted officers to help run the nation. Jeongjo also spearheaded bold new social initiatives, including opening government positions to those who were previously barred because of their social status.

He had some knowledge of humanities and philosophy, Neo-Confucianism. One of the King's gentlemen, Kim Jong-su, imprinted onto the king and in tandem became a father figure and a great teacher for him. He studied for a long time and read various books. Jeongjo had the support of the many Silhak scholars who supported Jeongjo's regal power, including Scholars Jeong Yak-yong, Pak Ji-won, Pak Je-ga and Yu Deuk-gong. His reign also saw the further growth and development of Joseon's popular culture.

Jeongjo was resolutely selected for member of Soron and Namin party, reason selection background was checks and balances, strengthening of royal authority.

He was opposed to new fashions in the composition style of Korean writing and personally taught composition to some intellectuals and bureaucrats called Munchebanjong(문체반정 文體反正).

In 1791, Jeongjo got report from Chae Je-gong that the people are having difficulty selling items. Jeongjo used Shinhae Tonggong to help people to raise their sales. This also abolished the Gumnanjeonguoun, which allowed some sellers in Seoul to have exclusivity.

Death
In his final years, Jeongjo arranged for the marriage of his second son and successor Sunjo of Joseon to Lady Kim of the Andong clan, daughter of Kim Jo-sun, but did not live to see his son's marriage. In 1800, Jeongjo died suddenly under uncertain circumstances at the age of 47, without seeing much of his life's work come to fruition under his son, Sunjo. There are many books regarding the mystery behind his death, and speculation as to the cause of his death continues even today.

He is buried with his wife, Queen Hyoui, at the royal tomb of Geonneung (건릉, 健陵) in the city of Hwaseong.

On 7 December 1899, Jeongjo was posthumously became Jeongjo Sanghwangjae.

Family 
Biological father: Yi Seon, King Jangjo of Joseon (조선 장조 이선) (13 February 1735 – 12 July 1762)
Grandfather: King Yeongjo of Joseon (조선 영조) (31 October 1694 – 22 April 1776)
Biological grandmother: Royal Noble Consort Yeong of the Jeonui Yi clan (영빈 이씨) (15 August 1696 – 23 August 1764)
Adoptive grandmother: Queen Jeongseong of the Daegu Seo clan (정성왕후 서씨) (12 January 1693 – 3 April 1757)
Adoptive father: Yi Haeng, King Jinjong of Joseon (조선 진종 이행) (4 April 1719 – 16 December 1728)
Biological mother: Queen Heongyeong of the Pungsan Hong clan (헌경왕후 홍씨) (6 August 1735 – 13 January 1816)
Grandfather: Hong Bong-han (홍봉한) (1713 – 1778)
Grandmother: Lady Yi of the Hansan Yi clan (한산 이씨) (1713 – 1755)
 Adoptive mother: Queen Hyosun of the Pungyang Jo clan (효순왕후 조씨) (8 January 1716 – 30 December 1751)
Consorts and their respective issue(s):
 Queen Hyoui of the Cheongpung Kim clan (효의왕후 김씨) (5 January 1754 – 10 April 1821) — No issue.
 Royal Noble Consort Su of the Bannam Park clan (수빈 박씨) (1 June 1770 – 6 February 1823)
Crown Prince Yi Gong (왕세자 이공) (29 July 1790 – 13 December 1834), second son
Princess Sukseon (숙선옹주) (1 March 1793 – 7 June 1836), second daughter
 Royal Noble Consort Ui of the Changnyeong Seong clan (의빈 성씨) (6 August 1753 – 4 November 1786)
Miscarriage (8 December 1780)
Miscarriage (July 1781)
Yi Sun, Crown Prince Munhyo (문효세자 이순) (13 October 1782 – 6 June 1786), first son
First daughter (20 March – 12 May 1784)
Unborn child (1786)
 Royal Noble Consort Won of the Pungsan Hong clan (원빈 홍씨) (27 May 1766 – 7 May 1779) — No issue.
 Royal Noble Consort Hwa of the Namwon Yun clan (화빈 윤씨) (11 April 1765 – 14 January 1824) — No issue.

Ancestry

In popular culture
 Portrayed by Kim Yong-gun in the 1989 MBC TV series 500 Years of Joseon Dynasty: Pa Mun.
 Portrayed by Jung Jae-gon in the 2001 MBC TV series Hong Guk-yeong.
 Portrayed by Lee Seo-jin and Park Ji-bin in the 2007 MBC TV series Lee San, Wind of the Palace.
 Portrayed by Ahn Nae-sang in the 2007 KBS2 TV series Conspiracy in the Court.
 Portrayed by Kim Sang-joong and Park Gun-tae in the 2007 CGV TV series Eight Days, Assassination Attempts against King Jeongjo. 
 Portrayed by Bae Soo-bin in the 2008 SBS TV series Painter of the Wind. 
 Portrayed by Han Myeong-goo in the 2008 film Portrait of a Beauty.
 Portrayed by Jo Sung-ha in the 2010 KBS2 TV series Sungkyunkwan Scandal.
 Portrayed by Hong Jong-hyun in the 2011 SBS TV series Warrior Baek Dong-soo.
 Portrayed by Hyun Bin and Goo Seung-hyun in the 2014 film The Fatal Encounter.
 Portrayed by Lee Je-hoon, Kim Woo-suk, and Kim Dan-yool in the 2014 SBS TV series Secret Door.
 Portrayed by Go Woo-rim in the 2015 KBS2 Drama Special Crimson Moon.
 Portrayed by So Ji-sub and Lee Hyo-je in the 2015 film The Throne.
Portrayed by Lee Jun-ho and Lee Joo-won in the 2021 MBC TV series The Red Sleeve.

References

External links 

Official website of Hwaseong Fortress
“Introduction.” A Unique Banchado: The Documentary Painting, with Commentary, of King Jeongjo's Royal Procesion to Hwaseong in 1795, by Han Young-woo and Chung Eunsun, Renaissance Books, Folkestone, 2017, pp. 1–6. JSTOR, www.jstor.org/stable/j.ctt1s17p7t.7.

1752 births
1800 deaths
18th-century Korean monarchs
People from Seoul
Jeonju Yi clan